Milos Calic (born 31 August 1992) is a Serbian rugby league player who plays for Villefranche XIII Aveyron in the Elite Two Championship He plays as a .

Career

Red Star
He started his career at Red Star

Villeneuve
Calic and Villeneuve teammate Vladica Nikolic were both signed from Serbian rugby league club Red Star.

Villefranche XIII Aveyron
On 22 Oct 2019 it was reported that he had signed for Villefranche XIII Aveyron in the Elite Two Championship

International
He made his international début on 3 Jul 2010 v Germany in a 40-14 victory

References

External links
Milos Calic - Treize Mondial

1992 births
Living people
Red Star Rugby League players
Rugby league second-rows
Serbia national rugby league team players
Serbian rugby league players
Villefranche XIII Aveyron players
Villeneuve Leopards players